Joseph Cressy (born July 10, 1984) is a former Canadian politician and activist who served on the Toronto City Council from 2014 to 2022. Cressy represented Ward 10 Spadina—Fort York, and was the chair of the Toronto Board of Health. He resigned from city council, effective April 30, 2022, to accept an appointment as senior vice president for external relations, communications and real estate development at George Brown College.

Career

Activism 
Cressy has worked on various social justice issues, which traces back to high school when he spent a year in South Africa. Upon returning to high school in Toronto, he got involved in the anti-Iraq war movement and has since worked on anti-poverty campaigns in South Africa, literacy programs with First Nations communities in Northern Ontario, and worked with The Stop Community Food Centre.

Cressy also supports LGBTQ issues, volunteering for an LGBTQ organization while studying abroad in Accra and supporting the New Democratic Party's (NDP) call for a visa ban against legislators who passed anti-gay laws in Russia.

Federal politics 

Cressy ran for the New Democratic Party (NDP) in a by-election seeking to represent Trinity—Spadina in the House of Commons following former NDP member of Parliament (MP) Olivia Chow's resignation to run for mayor of Toronto in the 2014 mayoral election. Cressy placed second, following winner Adam Vaughan who previously represented Ward 20 on Toronto City Council.

Toronto City Council 
Following his defeat federally, Cressy ran and was elected in the 2014 municipal election in Ward 20 Trinity—Spadina, succeeding Ceta Ramkhalawansingh, who was appointed interim councillor following Vaughan's resignation to run for MP.

As councillor, Cressy has sat on the Toronto Board of Health (serving as chair), the board of directors for Toronto Community Housing, the Parks and Environment Committee and the sub-committee on Climate Change and Adaptation.

Cressy ran again in the 2018 municipal election in the newly formed Ward 10 Spadina—Fort York, which his old ward was amalgamated into. He was re-elected by one of the widest victory margins of any councillor in the city with 55.06 per cent of the vote.

Cressy has announced he intends to retire from electoral politics and will not stand in the 2022 Toronto municipal election.

Personal life 
Cressy is the son of former Toronto city councillors Gordon Cressy and Joanne Campbell. His birth in 1984 made Campbell the first woman in Toronto City Council history to give birth to a child while serving as a councillor.

He studied public affairs and policy management at Carleton University. Prior to his entry into electoral politics, he worked for the Stephen Lewis Foundation and the Polaris Institute, and was campaign manager for Mike Layton's (son of former federal NDP leader Jack Layton) successful campaign for a city council seat in the 2010 municipal election and NDP MP Olivia Chow's re-election campaign in the 2011 federal election. He was also initially involved in Chow's mayoral campaign in 2014, but withdrew when he decided to run in the Trinity—Spadina by-election.

Election results

Unofficial results as of October 27, 2014 10:05 PM

References

External links

 Official site

1984 births
Living people
New Democratic Party candidates for the Canadian House of Commons
Toronto city councillors
Carleton University alumni